Lone Wiggers (born 1963, in Helsingør) is a Danish architect, one of the partners at C. F. Møller Architects.

Biography

Wiggers studied architecture at the Aarhus School of Architecture and the Ecole des Beaux Arts in Paris. After a year in London working with the Project Design Partnership (1989), she returned to Copenhagen where she joined Anna Maria Indrio (1990) before joining C. F. Møller Architects where she became a partner in 1997. Wiggers has participated in a wide range of projects including residential housing, commercial buildings, schools, old people's homes, hospitals and museums. They cover both new constructions and the conversion and restoration of older buildings. She has served on many boards and committees, heading the architecture committee for the Danish Ministry of Culture's cultural canon and participating in the Special Building Survey Council for the Cultural Heritage Board since 2003.

Awards
Wiggers was awarded the Copenhagen Masons' Guild's Architecture Prize in 1999 and the Nykredit Architecture Prize in 2006.

References

1963 births
Living people
Danish women architects
20th-century Danish women artists
20th-century Danish artists
21st-century Danish women artists
20th-century Danish architects
21st-century Danish architects
Danish Culture Canon committee members